Jim Schellnack (or Shellnack; died 24 May 1968) was an  Australian rules footballer who played seven games for South Melbourne during the 1904 VFL season.

Family
The son of Charles Frederick Schellnack (1831-1889), and Catherine Schellnack (1837-1922), née McDonald. James Schellnack (a.k.a. Shellnack) was born at Heathcote, Victoria in c.1880.

Football

Brunswick (VFA)
He played in 54 matches over five seasons (1899-1903) for the VFA Brunswick Football Club; and, on 8 August 1903, played in a team, against Essendon Town, at the Brunswick Oval, that also included a 17-year old John Curtin, the future Prime Minister of Australia, on the half-forward flank.

South Melbourne (VFL)

Death
He died at Parkville, Victoria on 24 May 1968.

Notes

References

External links 

Jim Schellnack's playing statistics from The VFA Project

1968 deaths
Australian rules footballers from Victoria (Australia)
Sydney Swans players
Brunswick Football Club players
1880s births